Sujit Roy (born 10 November 1984 in Jamshedpur, Bihar now Jharkhand) is an Indian first-class cricketer who plays for Jharkhand.

References

External links
 

1984 births
Living people
Indian cricketers
Jharkhand cricketers
Cricketers from Jharkhand
People from Jamshedpur